Dichomeris glenni is a moth in the family Gelechiidae. It was described by John Frederick Gates Clarke in 1947. It is found in North America, where it has been recorded from Florida, Illinois, Indiana, Kansas, Louisiana, Mississippi, Oklahoma, Ontario, Texas and Wisconsin.

References

Moths described in 1947
glenni